Nayabad Mosque or Noyabaad Mosque, is located in Nayabad village in Kaharole Upazila of Dinajpur District, Bangladesh, beside the Dhepa River.  It was built in 1793 CE during the rule of Mughal ruler Shah Alam II. As indicated by local belief it was built by the Muslim architectural workers who came from Persia to build the Kantajew Temple for their own use.

Structure
The building is oblong, with three entrances on one side. The roof has three domes, and at each corner an octagonal tower with a cupola (two of the cupolas are now missing).

References

Mosques in Bangladesh
Dinajpur District, Bangladesh
Religious buildings and structures completed in 1793
1793 establishments in India
1793 establishments in the British Empire
Archaeological sites in Dinajpur district